Bremerton High School is four-year public secondary school in the port city of Bremerton, Washington, west across Puget Sound from Seattle, in the Bremerton School District. Between 1993 and 2007, Bremerton High School contained grades 10–12 for enrolled students, but starting in the 2008 school year, the school facilitates grades 9–12, where grade 9 was previously contained at Bremerton Junior High School. Several changes in the district's grade configuration have meant freshmen have been in and out of the building.

In 2015, the school came to national attention following the suspension of football coach Joe Kennedy, who would pray at the 50-yard line of the field after varsity games. In 2022, the resulting lawsuit reached the Supreme Court, where it was decided in Kennedy v. Bremerton School District (2022) that Kennedy's First Amendment rights had been violated by the suspension.

History
The original Bremerton High School was founded in the 1920s with the first high school building. From at least the 1940s, the school was located in West Bremerton. In 1957 the school was split into West High School (which remained in place) and East High School, located across the Port Washington Narrows in East Bremerton, on Wheaton Way.

In 1978, "Bremerton High School" returned when East and West were combined, and its first commencement was held on June 8, 1979. Ronald K. Gillespie, former principal of West High School, was the first principal of the new Bremerton High. For the first few years, BHS occupied the buildings of former East High School. In September 1988, following the completion of a new facility at the original location of Bremerton/West High, the student body was moved back across the water to 1500 13th Street.

School colors and mascot

Bremerton High School's mascot is a Knight carrying The Sword of Justice and The Cape of Truth. The Cape of Truth was handmade by Marialis Jurges and introduced by the Class of 1996. During the Class of 2012 graduation, a second mascot, the Page was introduced. She now accompanies the Knight at all school gatherings. The school's traditional colors are Royal Blue and Gold. The official emblem is a Knight on a horse carrying a lance surrounded by a major arc with "Bremerton High School" written upon it.

The origin of the school colors and mascot comes from the unification of West Bremerton Wildcats, whose colors were blue and gold, and the East Bremerton Knights, whose colors were black and white. They chose the colors of West Bremerton and the mascot of East Bremerton giving us Bremerton High School's Knight along with Royal Blue and Gold as its colors. The Bremerton High School yearbook is known as "The Gauntlet."

Academics
Bremerton High School offers many honors and advanced placement classes:

Language and Composition
Literature and Composition
Biology
Chemistry
Environmental Science
Calculus
Statistics

Human Geography
Psychology
World History
US History
Studio Art
Art History

Controversy
In the fall of 2015, BHS drew national attention over assistant football coach, Joe Kennedy, and his seven year old practice of taking a knee and praying at the 50-yard line after varsity and JV games. School Superintendent Aaron Leavell, declared in September that Kennedy was in violation of federal court rulings and school district policy. Initially Kennedy bowed to Leavell's order, but in October, after acquiring legal advice and defense from the First Liberty Institute, coach Kennedy resumed his post-game prayer. Kennedy was put on paid leave on October 29, 2015, as per the school district statement.

Kennedy was the plaintiff in the Supreme Court case Kennedy v. Bremerton School District, in which the Court ruled in Kennedy's favor, affirming that the Establishment Clause of the U.S. Constitution does not mandate nor allow the school to suppress an individual's personal religious observance.

Notable alumni

Nathan Adrian (2006), Olympic swimmer, 2008 gold medalist, 2012 gold medalist in the 100-meter freestyle and 4x100-meter medley relay and silver medalist in the 4x100-meter freestyle relay, 2016 2x gold and 2x bronze medalist
Tony Boddie (1978), NFL running back
Norm Dicks (1959, West), U.S. congressman (1977–2013)
Bill Gates Sr. (1943), attorney and father of Microsoft co-founder Bill Gates
Don Heinrich (1948), NFL quarterback and coach
Dana Kirk (2002), Olympic swimmer
Tara Kirk (2000), Olympic swimmer
Joe Pichler (2005), child actor
Kevin Sargent (1987), NFL offensive tackle
Ted Tappe (1949), MLB outfielder
Gale Wade (1947), MLB outfielder
Marvin Williams (2004), NBA forward
Greg Williamson, Jazz drummer, Composer, and Professor

References

External links

 
 Bremerton School District Site

High schools in Kitsap County, Washington
Bremerton, Washington
Public high schools in Washington (state)
1921 establishments in Washington (state)
Educational institutions established in 1921